Manikyalu Malla Venkata (born 13 May 1958) is an Indian weightlifter. He competed in the men's flyweight event at the 1984 Summer Olympics.

References

1958 births
Living people
Indian male weightlifters
Olympic weightlifters of India
Weightlifters at the 1984 Summer Olympics
Place of birth missing (living people)
20th-century Indian people